Super Soul is an album by jazz organist Richard "Groove" Holmes fronting a big band which was recorded in 1967 in Chicago and released on the Prestige label.

Reception

Allmusic awarded the album 2 stars stating "Super Soul was a little funkier than much soul-jazz that had passed before 1967, and its horn parts sometimes slanted more toward pop and soundtrack territory... The album's a little on the innocuous side, even for a genre (Prestige 1960s soul-jazz) that can be pretty homogeneous. It's easygoing background party music, though Holmes summons an interesting light, prickly, almost vibes-like organ sound at times".

Track listing 
 "Why Don't You Do Right?" (Kansas Joe McCoy, Herb Morand) - 3:40   
 "Ain't That Peculiar" (Pete Moore, Smokey Robinson, Marv Tarplin, Ronald White) - 3:20   
 "In Between the Heartaches" (Burt Bacharach, Hal David) - 3:20   
 "Function at the Junction" (Eddie Holland, Fredrick Long) - 3:11   
 "Green Dolphin Street" (Bronisław Kaper, Ned Washington) - 6:40   
 "I Will Wait for You" (Michel Legrand, Jacques Demy) - 4:00   
 "Back Home Again in Indiana" (Ballard MacDonald, James F. Hanley) - 5:08   
 "Tennessee Waltz" (Redd Stewart, Pee Wee King) - 2:40   
 "Bluesette" (Toots Thielemans) - 4:10   
 "Super Soul" (Richard "Groove" Holmes) - 3:05

Personnel 
Richard "Groove" Holmes - organ
The Super Soul Big Band arranged and conducted by Richard Evans

References 

Richard Holmes (organist) albums
1967 albums
Prestige Records albums
Albums produced by Cal Lampley